is a 2002 Japanese original video animation based on Monkey Punch's Lupin III manga. Directed by Mamoru Hamatsu and released on April 3, 2002, it is the second OVA in the Lupin III franchise. The story features the return of the magician Pycal, in recognition of the 30th anniversary of the manga's first television anime adaptation. Return of Pycal won an Excellent Work Award at the 2003 Tokyo International Anime Fair. It was released in North America on July 27, 2021, by Discotek Media.

Plot
When Lupin attempts to steal a gem, he is interrupted by Pycal, a magician who was considered to have died after facing off with Lupin in the past (chapter 7: "Magician" of the original manga and episode 2: "The Man They Called a Magician" of the first anime series). Pycal, once a trickster, now seems armed with real magical abilities, and seems determined to get his revenge on Lupin.

Release
Return of Pycal was released on VHS and limited edition DVD by VAP on April 3, 2002. The limited edition DVD set includes a CD-ROM with a puzzle game, which if beaten would provide a password for ZIP files containing wallpapers, and a CD of the soundtrack. On April 23, 2003, a standard DVD version and a standalone CD of the soundtrack were released separately. Vap released Return of Pycal on Blu-ray on September 15, 2010.

Discotek Media announced their North American license to the OVA in December 2020. They released it on upscaled Blu-ray on July 27, 2021.

References

External links
 
 Return of Pycal at Lupin III Encyclopedia
 

2002 anime OVAs
Lupin the Third
Discotek Media
TMS Entertainment